John Maire (1703–1771) was a leading English Roman Catholic conveyancer.

Maire was the son of Thomas Maire of Lartington, Yorkshire, and an elder brother of the Roman Catholic priest William Maire. He was admitted to Gray's Inn in 1727; as a Catholic, Maire could not be called to the bar, and so he built up a conveyancing practice. He married Mary Lawson, who survived him, and had a seat at Lartington Hall.

Further reading
 Joseph Gillow, A literary and biographical history of the English Catholics

1703 births
Members of Gray's Inn
English Roman Catholics
1771 deaths
18th-century English people